The big-eared roundleaf bat (Hipposideros macrobullatus) is a species of bat in the family Hipposideridae. It is endemic to Indonesia, known from Kangean Islands, southwestern Sulawesi and Seram Island. It roosts in caves and tree hollows and probably forages in woodland. It is threatened by habitat loss through logging and other human activities.

Taxonomy and etymology
It was described in 1941 by American zoologist George Henry Hamilton Tate. Tate described it as a new subspecies of the bicolored roundleaf bat, with a trinomen of Hipposideros bicolor macrobullatus. The holotype had been collected by G. Heinrich in 1931 in Maros, Indonesia. Tate wrote that its skull was "noteworthy on the account of the large bullae," likely inspiring the specific epithet "macrobullatus" from Ancient Greek makrós meaning "large" and Latin bulla. In 1986, it was revised to full species status.

Description
Its fur is brown or reddish brown.

Range and habitat
It is endemic to Indonesia. Within Indonesia, it is known from the Kangean Islands, Seram Island, and southwestern Sulawesi.

Conservation
As of 2016, it is evaluated as a data deficient species by the IUCN. Habitat destruction is a likely threat.

References

Hipposideros
Bats of Indonesia
Endemic fauna of Indonesia
Bat, Big-eared roundleaf
Bat, Big-eared roundleaf
Fauna of Seram Island
Bat, Big-eared roundleaf
Mammals described in 1941
Taxonomy articles created by Polbot
Taxa named by George Henry Hamilton Tate